
This is a list of players who graduated from the Nike Tour in 1998. The top 15 players on the Nike Tour's money list in 1998 earned their PGA Tour card for 1999.

*PGA Tour rookie for 1999.

T = Tied
Green background indicates the player retained his PGA Tour card for 2000 (won or finished inside the top 125, excluding non-members).
Yellow background indicates player did not retain his PGA Tour card for 2000, but retained conditional status (finished between 126–150, excluding non-members).
Red background indicates the player did not retain his PGA Tour card for 2000 (finished outside the top 150).

Winners on the PGA Tour in 1999

Runners-up on the PGA Tour in 1999

See also
1998 PGA Tour Qualifying School graduates

References
Money list

Korn Ferry Tour
PGA Tour
Nike Tour graduates
Nike Tour graduates